Charles Neill (March 11, 1914 – September 28, 2002) was the first neurosurgeon in the state of Mississippi.  He helped establish the neurosurgery residency program at the University of Mississippi Medical Center.  Neill held office in the Southern Neurosurgical Society from 1958 to 1963 in the following capacities:

 1959 - Vice President
 1959-1962 - Secretary
 1963 - President-Elect
 1964 - President

References

Physicians from Mississippi
American neurosurgeons
1914 births
2002 deaths
20th-century surgeons